Pakistan participated at the 1954 Commonwealth Games in Vancouver, Canada.

Medalists

Medals by sport

References

 http://www.sports.gov.pk/Participation/1954_BE&C_Games.htm

Pakistan at the Commonwealth Games
Nations at the 1954 British Empire and Commonwealth Games